Happy Child High School (HCHS) is a co-educational institution situated in Rehabari, Guwahati (Assam). It was established on 13 January 1980 by Mr. M. P. Aggarwal and Mrs. Nirmal Aggarwal. It is affiliated to the Board of Secondary Education, Assam.

The first batch of 12 students appeared for matriculation (also known as High School Leaving Certificate Examination or HSLC Examination) in the year 1989. As of the year 2020, a total of 142 students appeared for matriculation from this school.

The school has two wings - a primary school building (consisting of classes Pre-nursery to 4) and a high school building (consisting of classes 5 to 10).

Background 
Mrs. Nirmal Aggarwal started her career as Headmistress of Tarun Ram Phukan School, Guwahati. Thereafter, on 31 August 1964, she joined Shishu Niketan, Guwahati. During her tenure as the Headmistress of Shishu Niketan, she had a strong inclination to start her own school and usher the holistic development to the students of the society.

The school made a humble beginning on 13 January 1980 at Kumarpara, Guwahati with its name being Happy Child Montessori School. In this noble venture of hers, special mention can be made of her husband, Mr. M. P. Aggarwal, and their children, who stood by her through thick and thin and extended their whole hearted support and encouragement. At the beginning, it was just a primary school with a handful of dedicated teachers and with classes starting from Pre Nursery to Class 2. When it got affiliated in the year 1988, it changed its name to Happy Child High School.

Publications 
 Milestone -  The school began to publish its annual magazine, Milestone, from the year 1990 onwards. Articles are published in English, Hindi and Assamese. Apart from the articles written by the students of the school, some articles of the School Faculty and Alumni are also published in the magazine.
 HCHS Chronicle -  The school decided to publish its tri-annual news-letter, HCHS Chronicle, in the year 2019. It keeps the readers updated on the activities of the school.

See also 
 Sanskriti The Gurukul - Founded by Mr. Ashutosh Aggarwal, son of Mrs. Nirmal Aggarwal

References

External links 
 Official Website of Happy Child High School, Rehabari

Schools in Guwahati
Co-educational schools in India
Private schools in India
High schools and secondary schools in Assam
Educational institutions established in 1980
1980 establishments in Assam